Telmatobius oxycephalus is a species of frog in the family Telmatobiidae.
It is endemic to Argentina.
Its natural habitats are subtropical or tropical moist montane forest and rivers.

References

oxycephalus
Amphibians of Argentina
Endemic fauna of Argentina
Taxonomy articles created by Polbot
Amphibians described in 1946